Into Something is an album by multi-instrumentalist Yusef Lateef recorded in 1961 and released on the New Jazz label.

Reception

The Allmusic reviewer Scott Yanowdescribed it as a "superior set.. a well rounded program" and "a particularly memorable performance".

Track listing 
All compositions by Yusef Lateef except where noted.
 "Rasheed" - 5:26
 "When You're Smiling (The Whole World Smiles with You)" (Mark Fisher, Joe Goodwin, Larry Shay) - 4:43
 "Water Pistol" - 5:40
 "You've Changed" (Bill Carey, Carl Fischer) - 4:53
 "I'll Remember April" (Gene de Paul, Patricia Johnston, Don Raye) - 6:51
 "Koko's Tune" - 6:29
 "P. Bouk" - 7:11

Personnel 
Yusef Lateef - tenor saxophone, flute (track 5), oboe (track 1)
Barry Harris - piano (tracks 1, 4, 5 & 7)
Herman Wright - bass
Elvin Jones - drums

References 

Yusef Lateef albums
1962 albums
Albums produced by Esmond Edwards
Albums recorded at Van Gelder Studio
New Jazz Records albums